The 1967–68 Greek Football Cup was the 26th edition of the Greek Football Cup. The competition culminated with the Greek Cup Final, held at Leoforos Alexandras Stadium, on 21 July 1968. The match was contested by Olympiacos and Panathinaikos, with Olympiacos winning by 1–0.

Calendar
From the last qualifying round onwards:

Last qualifying round

|}

Additional round

|}

• The last 16 of previous season's Cup qualified for the 2nd round.

Knockout phase
In the knockout phase, teams play against each other over a single match. If the match ends up as a draw, extra time will be played. If a winner doesn't occur after the extra time the winner emerges by a flip of a coin.The mechanism of the draws for each round is as follows:
In the draw for the round of 32, the teams that had qualified to previous' season Round of 16 are seeded and the clubs that passed the qualification round are unseeded.
In the draws for the round of 16 onwards, there are no seedings, and teams from the same group can be drawn against each other.

Bracket

Round of 32

|}

*Coin toss.

Round of 16

|}

*Coin toss.

Quarter-finals

|}

* Suspended at 115th minute.

** Suspended at 114th minute.

Semi-finals

|}

Final

The 24th Greek Cup Final was played at the Leoforos Alexandras Stadium.

References

External links
Greek Cup 1967-68 at RSSSF

Greek Football Cup seasons
Greek Cup
Cup